In Shin Buddhism, Shinjin (信心) was originally the Japanese word for the Buddhist concept of citta-prasāda (clear or clarified heart-mind), but now carries a more popular related meaning of faith or entrusting. According to Ueda, "shinjin is the mind of Amida Buddha given to and realized in a person. Shinran interprets shin  (信) to mean truth, reality, sincerity; jin  (心) means mind. When shinjin is realized, Amida's mind (wisdom and compassion) and the practitioners mind of blind passions become one."

Whilst a general Japanese Buddhist term it is particularly associated with the Jodo Shinshu teaching of Shinran.  In that context it refers to the awakening and settlement of the mind that is aware of the working of Amida Buddha's Primal Vow, and the assurance of birth in the Pure Land at death: 
In Notes on 'Essentials of Faith Alone' Shinran writes "Know that the true essence of the Pure Land teaching is that when we realize true and real shinjin, we are born in the true fulfilled land."

References

Bibliography
Kasulis, Thomas P. (1981). Review: Letters of Shinran: A Translation of Mattōshō. Volume I: Shin Buddhism Translation Series I by Yoshifumi Ueda, Philosophy East and West 31 (2), 246-248 
Friedrich, Daniel G. (2008). Shinjin, Faith, and Entrusting Heart : Notes on the Presentation of Shin Buddhism in English, 大阪女学院大学紀要 5, 107-117 	
Lee, Kenneth D. (2004).  Comparative Analysis of Shinran's Shinjin and Calvin's Faith, Buddhist-Christian Studies 24, 171-190
Ueda, Yoshifumi (1981). Response to Thomas P. Kasulis' Review of "Letters of Shinran", Philosophy East and West 31 (4), 507-511
Rogers, Minor L. (1980). Review: Letters of Shinran: A Translation of Mattosho, by Yoshifumi Ueda. Notes on `Essentials of Faith Alone': A Translation of Shinran's by Yuishinsho-mon'i., by Yoshifumi Ueda. Monumenta Nipponica 35 (4), 508-511

External links
 Jodo Shinshu Hongwanji-ha, Major Expositions KGSS III: A Collection of Passages Revealing The True Shinjin of the Pure Land Way; in: Shinran Works. The collected works of Shinran, including the Kyōgōshinshō.

Buddhism in Japan
Faith in Buddhism